The relationship between Palestine and Cyprus is characterized by close friendship and political alliance. Both countries were previously British colonies. Cyprus recognized the State of Palestine immediately after its declaration in 1988. Palestine has an embassy in Nicosia and Cyprus has a representative office in Ramallah. In January 2011, the Cypriot government reaffirmed its recognition of the Palestinian State in 1988, and added that it would not recognise any changes to the pre-1967 borders.

See also
Foreign relations of Cyprus
Foreign relations of Palestine

References 

Palestine
Bilateral relations of the State of Palestine
Cyprus–State of Palestine relations